George Gallo was the former Connecticut Republican State Party Chairman from 2005-2007 and Chief of Staff for the Connecticut House of Representatives from 2007-2014. He also served as Governor John G. Rowland's campaign manager in 2002.

In 2015, Gallo pleaded guilty to federal mail fraud. He was sentenced to a year and a day in prison for taking kickbacks on campaign mailings he arranged as chief of staff to the state legislature’s House GOP caucus.

References 

Members of the Connecticut House of Representatives
Year of birth missing (living people)
Living people